Jinu Joseph (born 21 December 1975) is an Indian actor who appears in Malayalam films. He is better known for his roles in Sagar Alias Jacky Reloaded, Chaappa Kurishu, Bachelor Party, Ustad Hotel, Iyobinte Pusthakam, Rani Padmini, Varathan Bheemante Vazhi and Anjaam Pathiraa.

Personal life
Jinu Joseph is married to Leah Samuel since 14 November 2012. They started living together since 2010. They have a son Mark Antony Joseph born on 3 October 2020.Jinu did a course in acting from Acting Studio,New York.

Filmography

Short films

References

External links
 

Living people
Male actors in Malayalam cinema
Indian male film actors
1975 births
Male actors from Kochi
21st-century Indian male actors